Paikara Union is a union of Kalihati Upazila, Tangail District, Bangladesh. It is situated 10 km northeast of Tangail, The district headquarter.

Demographics
According to Population Census 2011 performed by Bangladesh Bureau of Statistics, The total population of Paikara union is 28852. There are  7401 households in total.

Education
The literacy rate of Paikara Union is 39.2% (Male-41.5%, Female-37.1%).

See also
 Union Councils of Tangail District

References

Populated places in Dhaka Division
Populated places in Tangail District
Unions of Kalihati Upazila